José Luis Martell (born ) is a retired Mexican male volleyball player. He was part of the Mexico men's national volleyball team at the 2010 FIVB Volleyball Men's World Championship in Italy. He played for IMSS VALLE DE MEXICO until 2012 where he then retired.

Clubs
 IMSS Valle De Mexico (2010-2012)
 VaLePa Sastamala Tampere (2008-2009)
 Pamesa Teruel Voleibol (2006-2007)
 Arona Tenerife Sur (2002-2006)

References

1976 births
Living people
Mexican men's volleyball players
Place of birth missing (living people)
Sportspeople from Mexico City